Indian Institute of Technology Bhubaneswar (IIT Bhubaneswar) is a public technical university established by the government of India in 2008, located at Bhubaneswar, Odisha, India.

The institute admits a students for bachelor's, master's programs via JEE Advanced and Graduate Aptitude Test in Engineering respectively. The permanent campus at Argul, Khordha District was inaugurated by the current prime minister of India, Narendra Modi on 24 December 2018. The area of research are on science, engineering and humanities.

History

Earlier controversy
Establishing an IIT in Odisha was a long-standing demand for several decades. As the state ranked at the bottom in terms of centrally funded academic and research institutions, there were strong allegations of Congress led central government neglect. There were several incidents of protest, both locally in Odisha, the National Students Union of India (NSUI), and eminent nonresident Indian academics. An organization called Agamee Odisha was formed, that spearheaded mass agitation throughout the state. There also have been stray incidents of violence related to the issue of Odisha's neglect. Politicians including the Chief Minister of Odisha, Naveen Patnaik, cast this festering issue as a sign of severe neglect of the state by the UPA government in New Delhi. In May 2007, this became a major issue in the Indian parliament. The opposition NDA staged a walk-out in the Indian parliament, accusing the ruling UPA of neglecting the state's economic development. Sections of the media reported that the Congress party led UPA government had been embarrassed by this issue. Eventually, the HRD minister Mr. Arjun Singh relented, leading to the inception of IIT Bhubaneswar.

Establishment
The birth of the Indian Institute of Technology Bhubaneswar, came on the 60th anniversary of the country's Independence on 15 August 2007 when Dr. Manmohan Singh, Prime Minister of India at that time, made the announcement about the expansion of IIT system in the country. Further, the National Development Council of the Planning Commission, in its 54th meeting held on 19 December 2007, approved the proposal as part of the approval process of the 11th Five Year Plan (2007–12).

The actual birth of the institute was announced by the Minister of Human Resource Development Shri. Arjun Singh in a press conference on 28 March 2008. The Ministry of Human Resource Development, Department of Higher Education, Government of India, vide its Order dated 9 May 2008 decided that IIT Kharagpur would mentor the setting up of this new IIT for 2–3 years. It was further decided that the Director of the mentor IIT i.e. IIT Kharagpur, would be the mentor Director of the new IIT pending selection of regular Director and the chairman, Board of Governors (BOG) of IIT Kharagpur would also be the Chairman of the BOG of this new mentored IIT Bhubaneswar.

The Cabinet also approved creation of the post of Director and Registrar along with 30 Faculty per year for each of the new IITs. It was also decided that pending amendment of the Institute of Technology Act, 1961 for inclusion of IIT Bhubaneswar as an Institute of National Importance, the Institute would start functioning under aegis of Indian Institute of Technology Bhubaneswar Society to be registered under the Societies' Registration Act, 1860 (Act XXI of 1860).

Papers were filed on 19 July 2008 with the Registrar of Societies Odisha, Cuttack for registration of IIT Bhubaneswar Society and the society was registered on 22 July 2018.

IIT Bhubaneswar became the first amongst the eight new IITs to become operational with a sanctioned intake of 40 students each in the disciplines of Civil, Mechanical and Electrical Engineering. Classes for the first batch of students started from the campus of IIT Kharagpur at Kharagpur, the mentor Institute for IIT Bhubaneswar on 23 July 2008 with admission of 95 students. IIT BHUBANESWAR became an Institute of National Importance from 29 June 2012 with notification of Amendment in the Institutes' of Technology Act, 1961 by the Ministry of Human Resource Development, (Department of Higher Education)Government of India published in the Gazette of India dated 2 July 2012.

The process of selection of Faculty and the Registrar were initiated through an issue of advertisement on all India basis. Shri Bata Kishore Ray from MHRD Govt. of India joined as the first employee and first Registrar of the institute on 31 December 2008.

To finalise the site for the permanent campus of IIT Bhubaneswar, the MHRD had set up a Site Identification Committee under the Chairmanship of Shri Ashok Takhur, Additional Secretary to the Government of India which visited Odisha during 24–25 December 2008. After visiting four sites proposed by the Government of Odisha i.e. Banki, Ramdaspur in Cuttack district and Gayabandh and Jatni in Khordha district, the Committee recommended the site at Jatni. The recommendation of the committee was approved by the Government of India on 13 January 2009. The Government of Odisha agreed to provide  of land free of cost out of which  had been given physical possession on 10 February 2009. The State Government also agreed to provide other facilities including a four-lane road from National Highway No.5 ( Kolkata-Chennai) to the IIT. Prof M Chakraborty, deputy director, IIT Kharagpur joined as the Director of IIT Bhubaneswar on 19 May 2009. He took over the rein from Prof D. Acharya, the earlier Director of the institute. IIT Bhubaneswar became operational in the city of Bhubaneswar on 22 July 2009 with shifting 2008 batch of students from IIT Kharagpur and admission of 117 new students in 2009. The Institute started functioning at IIT Kharagpur's Extension Centre built in 1998 in Bhubaneswar.

Campus and location

Permanent Campus
The Government of Odisha has allotted about 936 acres of Government land for permanent campus of the institute. In addition, the State Government is acquiring about 16 acres of private land at its own cost to make the land contiguous. The Foundation Stone of the permanent campus at Arugul, on the outskirts of Bhubaneswar was laid on 12 February 2009. Construction of 4-lane access road from the National Highway 5 and provision of water and electric supply to the campus by the State Government have made considerable progress. The Government of Odisha has also agreed to provide 75 acres of land along the Puri-Konark coastline to set up an Innovation Centre for Climate Change. The site near Jatni Railway Station on the East Coast Railway is 35 kilometres from Biju Patnaik Airport Bhubaneswar. The land is picturesque with Barunai Hill on one side and a reserve forest nearby. A science park is being set up as a part of this institution to support industry oriented research activities. The institute has started operating in its new campus at Arugul from academic year 2015–16. The campus construction began on 14 August 2011, Chief minister Naveen Patnaik laid the foundation stone of the IIT campus at Aragul village near Jatni. The campus master plan has been prepared by Vastunidhi Architects, Noida.

Marine Campus
IIT Bhubaneswar is the first IIT to set up a separate marine campus in 2011 for conducting research in rising sea levels, ecology, disaster management, marine ecosystems, fishery development, and other areas. This campus, which will be a part of the School of Earth, Ocean and Environment Sciences, will be set up near Chilka lake. It will have educational facilities for undergraduate and postgraduate students.

Temporary Campuses
The institute used to operate from a number of locations within the city of Bhubaneswar which included Extension Centre of IIT Kharagpur, Toshali Bhawan and Workshop cum Laboratory Complex near IIT Kharagpur Extension Centre for laboratory facilities, particularly of 3rd and 4th year students. Besides, the Institute had also received tremendous support from other institutes viz. Institute of Minerals and Materials Technology and Central Tool Room & Training Centre for laboratory and workshop facilities, respectively.

Hostel & Housing
Hostel facilities to students have been provided through a 200 capacity Dr. A. N. Khosla Hall of Residence of IIT Kharagpur near its Extension Center. In addition, the institute has two hostels (started in July 2015) at its permanent campus, Mahanadi Hall of residence(MHR) of 800 capacity for boys and Subarnarekha Hall of Residence(SHR) for girls of 200 capacity. The institute has also provided housing facility for the Faculty members and the staff members at its campus, Faculty Quarter(FQ) and Staff Quarter(SQ).

Education Hub
Several other universities and research institutions are either present or being established in the vicinity, including AIIMS Bhubaneswar, NISER, IIIT, XIMB, one of the Indian government's proposed National Universities of international calibre, and the Institute of Physics. NISER's campus is 2 km away from the IIT. Other institutions, such as Sri Sri University, premier law school National Law University Odisha, as well as the world's biggest academic institution, Vedanta University, will be in the neighboring places of Cuttack and Puri respectively. An advantage of this IIT is its location at Bhubaneswar, an emerging education hub, that is being promoted as an Information Technology Investment Region (ITIR) by the government. A total of 40 km2 of land has been allocated for the purpose, out of which about 60% will be devoted to research and development. An estimated  will be invested by the Indian government within the next few years in order to develop the institute.

Connectivity
The Odisha state government is constructing a four-lane expressway directly from the National Highway No. 5 (a part of the Golden Quadrilateral) to this new IIT for increased connectivity. Khurda Rd railway station is 4 km away from the campus, and the Biju Patnaik airport is 35 km away. A new international airport is being constructed even closer to the IIT campus at a distance of 12 km.

Organization and administration

Governance

All IITs follow the same organization structure which has President of India as visitor at the top of the hierarchy. Directly under the president is the IIT Council. Under the IIT Council is the board of governors of each IIT.
Under the board of governors is the director, who is the chief academic and executive officer of the IIT. Under the director, in the organizational structure, comes the deputy director. Under the director and the deputy director, come the deans, heads of departments, registrar.

Schools
The institute has adopted the concept of Schools rather than Departments for promoting inter-disciplinary research. At present the following Schools offer academic programmes:

 School of Basic Sciences (Physics, Chemistry, Bio Science & Mathematics)
 School of Humanities, Social Sciences and Management (Economics, English & Psychology)
 School of Mechanical Sciences (Mechanical Engineering)
 School of Infrastructure (Civil Engineering) 
 School of Electrical Sciences (CSE, ECE & Electrical Engineering) 
 School of Mineral, Metallurgical and Materials Engineering (Metallurgy & Material Engineering)
 School of Earth, Ocean and Climate Sciences (Geology, Atmospheric & Ocean Science)

Research Centres 

 Virtual & Augmented Reality
 Design & Innovation
 Probiotics & Human Microbiome
Material Science
AI & Mechatronics
Human-Computer Interface
Quantum Chemistry
Protein Biophysics
Synthetic Organic Chemistry
Coastal Observatory
Chips 2 Startup

Structure

Academics

The academic programmes of Institute include BTech (Hons.) in Computer Science, Civil, Electrical, ECE and Mechanical Engineering with an intake capacity of 50 each at the undergraduate level. BTech (Hons.) in Metallurgical and Materials Engineering is with intake capacity of 20. The institute also started Dual degree courses in Mechanical and Civil with intake of 10 from academic year 2016–17, which has been increased to 15 for Mechanical and 13 for Civil as of 2020–21. The Institute started the Doctoral programme from the academic session 2009–2010 and will offer admission to the joint MTech-PhD Programme from July 2012. The institute has broadly adopted the course curricula, syllabi and other academic regulations of IIT Kharagpur, the mentor institute.

Academic year
The academic year is divided into two semesters, a spring semester and an autumn semester. Between these two regular semesters, the academic year also includes a shorter summer quarter, during which some courses are offered. The institution follows the credit-based system of performance evaluation. The credits allocated to each course depends on the total number of contact hours, including lectures, tutorials and laboratory sessions. Each course is usually worth three credits. The typical course load per semester is 21–24 credits for undergraduate students.

Undergraduate programs
IIT Bhubaneswar offers undergraduate degrees in six technical disciplines and integrated five-year programs for undergraduate students leading to MTech degrees.

The BTech degree is based on a four-year program comprising eight semesters. The first year of the BTech curriculum has common courses from various departments. At the end of the first year, an option to change departments is given to meritorious students on the basis of their performance in the first two semesters. From the second year onwards, the students take courses offered exclusively by their departments that are known as "electives". In addition to these, the students takes inter-disciplinary courses known as "Lateral courses" and breadth courses for courses in humanities and social sciences, and management and information technology.
During the 7th & 8th semester, undergraduate students undergo co-curricular practical training in Indian industry and undertake a Research project.

Admission

Admission to these programs is through the Joint Entrance Examination (JEE), taken by students seeking admission into the IITs after completing 12 years of schooling. As of 2016, the total undergraduate student intake every year is 260, with 40 students in each of the above-mentioned disciplines and 20 in Metallurgical and Materials Engineering.Each Dual degree courses has an intake of 10 students. The plan is to have 2,500 students within 3–4 years, which will expand to 10,000 students within 15 years.

Postgraduate programs
The MTech degree is based on a two-year program comprising four semesters. Research is included as a component in the MTech level.

Institute offers Joint MTech — PhD programs in all its schools except for the Schools of Basic Sciences and Humanities, Social Sciences & Management.

Doctorate programs

Institute has been admitting students into PhD programs since 2009.

Rankings 

IIT Bhubaneswar was ranked at 701–750 in the world by the QS World University Rankings 2022 list.

Among engineering colleges, IIT Bhubaneswar ranked 12 by India Today in 2020. It ranked 28 among engineering colleges by the National Institutional Ranking Framework (NIRF) in 2021

It was ranked 601–800 in the world by the Times Higher Education World University Rankings of 2020, 169 in Asia and 196 among Emerging Economies in 2020.

Library
The central library, which started functioning in January 2010, is a  room with a collection of 23000, text books. In addition, the mentor institute, IIT Kharagpur, provides IIT Bhubaneswar with access to its online resources such as e-databases, e-journals and abstract indexing services.

Collaborations

Foreign 
Sources:
 University of Quebec, Canada
 University of Waterloo, Canada
 York University, Canada
 Texas A&M University, US
 Warwick Manufacturing Group, UK
University at Buffalo, US
McGill University, Canada
 Shanghai Jiao Tong University, China
 University of Edinburg, UK 
 University of Western Ontario, Canada
 University of North Texas, US
 University of Warwick, UK
 University of Massachusetts Dartmouth, US
 Washington University in St. Louis, US
 University of Southampton, UK
 National Oceanography Centre, UK
 University of Concepción, Chile 
 Woods Hole Oceanographic Institution, US
 University of Surrey, UK
 University of Manchester, UK
 University of British Columbia, Canada
 Association for Overseas Technical Co-operation and Sustainable Partnership, Japan

National 

 DRDO
 OPTCL
 AIIMS BBSR
 BHEL
 NALCO
NMDC
WHEEBOX
NHAI
MOES
AICTE
ISRO
SDI BBSR

Student life

Festivals

 Alma Fiesta: Alma Fiesta is the annual socio-cultural festival of Indian Institute of Technology, Bhubaneswar. It is a three-day festival. Usually launched during the mid weeks of January, Alma Fiesta offers a number of events that range from cultural performances like Odissi, Gotipua to clay modeling workshops, Euphony (War of rock bands), Spotlight (Stage play competition). The events organized also include modern dance forms like hip-hop, vocals, duets, karaoke, single minute extempore, spelling bee, pencil sketching as well as a youth marathon. Alma Fiesta also maintain a social drive named Prayatna. 
 Wissenaire: Wissenaire is the annual techno-management festival of Indian Institute of Technology, Bhubaneswar which is held in its permanent campus located in Argul, Odisha. It is a three-day- long event usually held in the month of January every year. Wissenaire encompasses various sectors of technology, science and management. These include quizzing, coding, designing, robotics, planning and testing the creativity and innovative spirit of the young, intelligent minds.
 Entrepreneurship Summit: E-Summit, organized by the E-Cell hosts a number of panel discussions, workshops, competitions, and start-ups with the presence of personalities from industries, academia, and government.

Societies
The student societies are:
 Web Design Society. (WebnD)
 Astronomy Society.(Nakshatra)
 Programming Society. (Neuromancers)
 Dance Society.(D-Gang)
 Dramatics Society. (The Fourth Wall)
 Entrepreneurship Cell.(E-Cell)
 Film Making Society. (Cinewave)
 Fine Arts Society. (Kalakriti)
 Literary Societies. (Panacea, Abhivyakti)
 Music Society.(Aaroh)
 Photography Society. (Clix)
 Robotics Society.(R.I.S.C)
 Social Welfare Society. (Souls for Solace)
 Quiz Society

Startup Incubation
The Department of Science & Technology and the Ministry of Human Resource Development, Government of India sanctioned Rs.1.50 Crore for establishing a Startup Centre at IIT Bhubaneswar. The then Director of IIT Bhubaneswar inaugurated the center on 20 June 2016. The Startup Centre is envisioned to have enrollment minimum of 10 startups in the 1st year of its commencement. This facility is going to be made available to all budding entrepreneurs of the region. Additionally, the Institute established an in-house technology incubator, as a part of well-thought-of incubation-cum-entrepreneurial eco-system with the objective of encouraging students to take up entrepreneurship. This facility would be made available to the outgoing students and to the faculty of the institute. In 2017, the institute received license and incorporation certificate from Registrar of companies to run IIT Bhubaneswar Research and Entrepreneurship Park, a not for profit company which will act as a nodal center for promoting entrepreneurship, research, and startup activities.

Dance as a B tech Subject 
In 2015, IIT Bhubaneswar introduced Odissi dance as a BTech subject becoming the first IIT in the country to introduce any dance form in its curriculum. Noted Odissi exponents Kum Kum Mohanty, Iliana Citaristi along with other experts in the field have been roped in to design the curriculum and the exam pattern for the course. Any student who continues it until the final year will get a diploma in dance as well.

References

External links

 

Bhubaneswar
Education in Bhubaneswar
All India Council for Technical Education
Educational institutions established in 2008
Engineering colleges in Odisha
Science and technology in Bhubaneswar
2008 establishments in Orissa